Michael, Mike or Mick Armstrong may refer to:

Politics
Michael Armstrong (politician) (1924–1982), Northern Irish unionist politician
Mike Armstrong (politician) (born 1957), American politician

Sports
Michael Armstrong (hurler) (born 1990), Northern Irish hurler
Mike Armstrong (baseball) (born 1954), American baseball player
Michael Armstrong (boxer) (born 1968), British boxer, born Michael Morris
Michael Gomez (born 1977), Manchester-Irish boxer who was born Michael Armstrong

Other
Michael F. Armstrong (1932–2019), American lawyer
C. Michael Armstrong (born 1938), American businessman, former chairman of AT&T
Michael Armstrong (filmmaker) (born 1944), British writer, director, and cinematographer
Mick Armstrong, Australian socialist activist and author
Mike Armstrong, Canadian television journalist for Global National

See also 
 Armstrong (surname)